George Clooney is an American actor and filmmaker. He is one of the highest-grossing actors of all time with over $1.9 billion total box office gross and an average of $61.7 million per film. He has been involved in thirteen films that grossed over $200 million at the worldwide box office.

Clooney starred in the television series The Facts of Life (1985–87), Roseanne (1988–91), Bodies of Evidence (1992–93), Sisters (1993–94) and ER (1994–99). Early in his career, Clooney also appeared in a number of low-budget film roles like Grizzly II: Revenge (1983), Return to Horror High (1987), Combat Academy (1987), Return of the Killer Tomatoes (1988), Unbecoming Age (1992) and The Harvest (1993). His role as doctor Doug Ross on ER earned him Golden Globe and Emmy Award nominations.

In the 1990s Clooney appeared in the films From Dusk till Dawn (1996), One Fine Day (1996), with Michelle Pfeiffer, The Peacemaker (1997) with Nicole Kidman, Batman & Robin (1997), and Out of Sight (1998) opposite Jennifer Lopez. The new millennium saw Clooney in films The Perfect Storm (2000), which earned $328.7 million at the box office and O Brother, Where Art Thou? (2000), which won him a Golden Globe Award, as well as Empire Award and Satellite Award nominations. In 2001, he teamed up again with Soderbergh for the star-studded caper film Ocean's Eleven, alongside Matt Damon, Brad Pitt and many others. The film was followed by two sequels starring Clooney, Ocean's Twelve in 2004 and Ocean's Thirteen in 2007. He has also appeared in Solaris (2002), Welcome To Collinwood (2002), Intolerable Cruelty (2003), Syriana (2005), for which he was rewarded with an Academy Award for Best Supporting Actor, The Good German (2006), Michael Clayton (2007), Burn After Reading (2008), Up in the Air (2009), for the latter earning an Academy Award nomination. Clooney also directed and starred in Confessions of a Dangerous Mind (2002), Good Night, and Good Luck (2005), Leatherheads (2008), The Ides of March (2011), and The Midnight Sky (2020).

In 2011, Clooney starred in Alexander Payne's The Descendants, earning a Golden Globe Award for Best Actor – Motion Picture Drama and an Academy Award nomination. In 2013, he co-starred opposite Sandra Bullock in the space thriller Gravity. He directed, co-produced, co-wrote, and starred in The Monuments Men, originally scheduled for release in 2013, but pushed back until 2014. He next starred in Brad Bird's science fiction film Tomorrowland, released on May 22, 2015.

Film

Acting roles

Filmmaking credits

Television

As producer

See also
 List of awards and nominations received by George Clooney

References

General

External links
 
 
 

Clooney, George
Clooney, George
Clooney, George
Filmography